Świnica (Polish) or Svinica (Slovak) is a mountain in the main crest of the High Tatras, on the Polish-Slovak border. The main peak is at 2,301 m AMSL. A marked trail leads through the summit. The Polish name Świnica (derivative form of a pig or swine) was given to this summit in the mid 19th century. It probably refers to the resemblance of the peak to silhouette of a swine. Another, doubtful explanation, is that the summit was difficult to reach.

Two-thousanders of Poland
Landforms of Lesser Poland Voivodeship
Two-thousanders of Slovakia
Poland–Slovakia border
International mountains of Europe
High Tatras
Mountains of the Western Carpathians